General McMahon could refer to:

John E. McMahon (1860–1920), U.S. Army major general
Norman McMahon (1866-1914), British Army general
Robert H. McMahon (fl. 2010s), U.S. Air Force major general
Sir Thomas McMahon, 2nd Baronet (1779–1860), British Army lieutenant general
Sir Thomas Westropp McMahon, 3rd Baronet (1813–1892), British Army general

See also
Hugh MacMahon (Indian Army officer) (1880–1939), British Indian Army major general
Patrice de MacMahon (1808–1893), French general and politician